Song Jae-hee (born December 11, 1979) is a South Korean actor.

Personal life 
In August 2022, Song announced that his wife was pregnant with their first child. His wife gave birth to a daughter on January 20, 2023.

Filmography

Film

Television series

Discography

References

External links
 
 

1979 births
Living people
21st-century South Korean male actors
South Korean male television actors
South Korean male film actors
Seoul Institute of the Arts alumni
Republic of Korea Marine Corps personnel